Manolis is a Greek masculine given name, which is sometimes a contraction of Emmanouil. It may refer to:

Manolis Anagnostakis (1925–2005), Greek poet and critic at the forefront of the Marxist and existentialist poetry movements
Manolis Andronikos (1919–1992), Greek archaeologist and a professor at the Aristotle University of Thessaloniki
Manolis Angelopoulos (1939–1989), Greek singer of Gypsy origins
Manolis Chiotis (1920–1970), Greek rebetiko and laiko composer, singer and bouzouki player
Manolis Glezos (1922–2020), Greek left-wing politician and writer, participated in the World War II resistance
Manolis Kalomiris (1883–1962), Greek classical composer
Manolis Kefalogiannis (born 1959), Greek politician and former Minister for Mercantile Marine of Greece
Manolis Liapakis (born 1984), Greek footballer
Manolis Mavrommatis (born 1941), Greek politician and former Member of the European Parliament for New Democracy
Manolis Moniakis (born 1988), Greek footballer
Manolis Papamakarios (born 1980), Greek professional basketball player
Manolis Pappas (born 1951), Greek former footballer
Manolis Pratikakis (born 1943), award-winning Greek poet
Manolis Psomas (born 1978), footballer
Manolis Rasoulis (1945–2011), lyricist of famous songs, Greek music composer, singer, writer and journalist
Manolis Roubakis (born 1979), Greek footballer
Manolis Skoufalis (born 1978), Greek footballer
Manolis Triantafyllidis (1883–1959), major representative of the demotic movement in education in Greece
Manolis Xexakis (born 1948), Greek poet and prose writer

See also
Manilius (disambiguation)
Manoleasa
Manolich
Manualist (disambiguation)
Miaoulis (disambiguation)
Monolistra

Greek masculine given names
Hypocorisms